Lawn bowls at the 2014 Commonwealth Games were held at the Kelvingrove Lawn Bowls Centre in Glasgow, Scotland from 24 July to 1 August 2014.

Lawn bowls is one of ten core sports at the Commonwealth Games and has been continuously held at every Games since the 1930 British Empire Games, with the exception of the 1966 British Empire and Commonwealth Games in Kingston, Jamaica. The men's and women's fours events returned to the program for the first time since the 2002 Commonwealth Games and two new para-sports events made their debut at these Games.

Schedule
All times are British Summer Time (UTC+1)

Events

Men

Women

Para-sport

Medal table

See also
List of Commonwealth Games medallists in lawn bowls
Lawn bowls at the Commonwealth Games

References

External links
Commonwealth Games Lawn Bowls Medal Winners
Official results book – Lawn Bowls

 
2014 Commonwealth Games events
2014
2014 in bowls
Bowls in Scotland
Parasports competitions